Robert Franklin Lewis (born March 20, 1945) is a retired American basketball player.

Lewis grew up in Northwest Washington, D.C. and developed a lot of his skills at the Jelleff's Boys Club in Georgetown, under the tutelage of Joe Branzell.

He played in high school at DC's St. John's College High School, playing for coach Joe Gallagher.

In his junior year, Lewis averaged 25.4 ppg, scoring a season high 40 vs the Georgetown frosh, and was named first team All Met.

In his Sr year, Lewis was the Daily News SSA Player of the Year, named first team All Met for the second year in a row, and capped it off with an appearance on the Ed Sullivan Show as a Parade Magazine All-American for 1963.

He then played for Dean Smith at the University of North Carolina, where he played an integral role on the 1967 ACC Champion and Final Four team. He averaged 27.4 points per game in 1966, the second-highest single-season average in UNC history. On December 16, 1965, he scored 49 points against Florida State, the most ever for a UNC player. He currently ranks tenth all time in scoring at UNC with 1,836 career points.

He was an All-ACC and All-America selection in 1966 and 1967. Because of his national accolades, Lewis' number 22 was honored by the University of North Carolina and currently hangs in the rafters of the Dean Smith Center.

He was selected by the San Francisco Warriors in the 4th round (39th pick overall) of the 1967 NBA draft.  He was also selected by the Anaheim Amigos in the 1967 ABA Draft.

He played for the Warriors in the NBA for three seasons and with the Cleveland Cavaliers for one. During his professional career, he averaged 5.8 points, 2.1 rebounds, and 2.2 assists per game.

See also

References

External links

1945 births
Living people
All-American college men's basketball players
American men's basketball players
Anaheim Amigos draft picks
Basketball players from Washington, D.C.
Cleveland Cavaliers expansion draft picks
Cleveland Cavaliers players
North Carolina Tar Heels men's basketball players
Parade High School All-Americans (boys' basketball)
San Francisco Warriors draft picks
San Francisco Warriors players
Shooting guards